Hermanus Eliza Verschoor  (10 July 1791, in Sleeuwijk – 2 August 1877, in Sleeuwijk) was a Dutch politician.

1791 births
1877 deaths
Members of the Senate (Netherlands)
People from Sleeuwijk